is a Japanese light novel series written by Nachi Kio and illustrated by Eretto. Media Factory have published eleven volumes and three spin-off volumes since March 2017 under their MF Bunko J imprint. A manga adaptation with art by Bonjin Hirameki was serialized via Kodansha's Niconico-based Suiyōbi no Sirius manga service from November 2018 to September 2019, before transferring to Magazine Pocket and being serialized from September 2019 to April 2022. It has been collected in seven tankōbon volumes. An anime television series adaptation by Feel aired from July to September 2021.

Premise
Hashiba Kyouya is an aspiring game developer but things did not go well for him. His company went bankrupt, he lost his job and is left with the sole option of returning to his hometown. Looking at other successful creators of his age, he finds himself regretting his life decisions as he lay distressed on his bed. As Kyouya wakes up, he discovers that he has traveled ten years back to the time before he entered college. Will he use this opportunity to make things right?

Characters

Main
 
 
 Kyouya is a 28-year-old unemployed man from Nara Prefecture who quit his salaryman job only to lose his dream job at a bishōjo games developer after it went bankrupt. A fortunate encounter with Eiko Kawasegawa gave him another opportunity to participate in a big game project, though it, unfortunately, gets canceled as well. He then somehow time leaped 10 years into the past, to the moment where he just passed the Ōnaka University of Arts entrance exam. He decided to remake his life so he can be a better game creator. He is currently living in Share House Kitayama along with Aki Shino, Nanako Kogure, and Tsurayuki Rokuonji.

 
 
 A resident of Share House Kitayama, Shino is a girl who came from Itoshima, Fukuoka. She is nicknamed "Shinoaki" by the share house residents despite it being a masculine name. She has a petite figure, big breasts, and sometimes a calm and motherly temperament. In one of the timelines, she is married to Kyouya and have a daughter together.

 
 
 A resident of Share House Kitayama, Nanako is a girl who has the appearance of a gyaru, but is actually an innocent girl who came from Shiga Prefecture. In the present time, she is an active popular singer with the stage name N@NA. She develops feelings for Kyouya. In the timeline where Kyouya and Aki married, she considers ending her singing career due to a lack of success, but is inspired to continue after remembering him.

 
 
 A resident of Share House Kitayama. Despite how he acts, he is actually talented at scenario writing. In the present time, he is known as a popular light novel writer under the pen name . In the timeline where Kyouya and Aki married, he decides not to pursue a writing career.

 
 
 A student at Ōnaka University of Arts whom Kyouya meets in the present time as the leader of a game project planner.

Others

A professor at the Ōnaka University of Arts. She is Eiko's older sister.

Kyouya's sister.

A popular illustrator.

Media

Light novels
The series will end with the release of its 12th volume in 2023.

Remake Our Life!

Bokutachi no Remake β
A spin-off series first released on August 24, 2019. It is an alternative story of Kyouya who has never returned to 10 years in the past, and instead once again struggling his way out in the game industry together with Eiko Kawasegawa.

Manga
A manga adaptation illustrated by Bonjin Hirameki was serialized in Kodansha's Suiyōbi no Sirius service on the Niconico website from November 2018 to September 2019, it was later transferred to the Magazine Pocket website where it ran from September 2019 to April 2022. It has been collected in seven tankōbon volumes with the last in May 2022.

Anime
An anime adaptation was announced on December 20, 2019, which was revealed to be a television series on November 25, 2020. The series is animated by Feel and directed by Tomoki Kobayashi, with Nachi Kio handling the series' scripts, Kōsuke Kawamura designing the characters, and Frontwing producing the series. Seima Kondo and Yusuke Takeda are composing the series' music. It aired from July 3 to September 25, 2021 on Tokyo MX and other channels. Poppin'Party performed the series' opening theme song , while Argonavis performed the series' ending theme song . Crunchyroll (previously known as Funimation) licensed the series outside of Asia. The series has been dubbed into English, which premiered on August 3, 2022 and was produced in Coppell, Texas. Medialink licensed the series for both South Asia and Southeast Asia territories, and is streaming on its Ani-One YouTube channel and iQIYI. The company also licensed the anime to Animax Asia for TV releases in TV releases.

Episode list

Reception
The light novel series ranked sixth in 2018 and seventh in 2019 in Takarajimasha's annual light novel guide book Kono Light Novel ga Sugoi!, in the bunkobon category.

Notes

References

External links
 
 
 

2017 Japanese novels
2019 Japanese novels
2021 anime television series debuts
2020s college television series
Anime and manga about time travel
Anime and manga based on light novels
Crunchyroll anime
Feel (animation studio)
Fiction set in 2006
Fiction set in 2016
Japanese webcomics
Kadokawa Dwango franchises
Kodansha manga
Light novels
Medialink
MF Bunko J
Novels about time travel
Shōnen manga
Webcomics in print